Alaska Wilderness Lake is a 1971 American documentary film produced by Alan Landsburg. It was nominated for an Academy Award for Best Documentary Feature. It was based on the book Red Salmon, Brown Bear by Theodore J. Walker.

References

External links

1971 films
1971 documentary films
American documentary films
Films shot in Alaska
Documentary films about Alaska
1970s English-language films
1970s American films